Luísa de Jesus (December 10, 1748 – July 1, 1772), known as The Foundling Wheel Killer (Portuguese: A Assassina da Roda), was a Portuguese baby farmer and serial killer who smothered at least 33 infants near Coimbra from the 1760s until 1772. While she confessed to only 28 of these, she was convicted on all counts, sentenced to death and ultimately executed, becoming the last woman to be executed in the country's history.

Biography 
Luísa de Jesus was born on December 10, 1748, in Figueira de Lorvão, the daughter of poor farmers Manoel and Marianna Rodrigues. Little is known of her personal life, aside from the fact that as an adult, she was married and would sometimes earn money from transporting goods from town to town.

As she constantly suffered financial problems, De Jesus eventually hatched a money-making scheme involving a foundling wheel near Coimbra: at the time, these devices were used by mothers to abandon their children, in the hopes that a good samaritan with means would take them instead. The prospective adoptee could then be awarded 600 réis, a cradle and half a meter of thick cotton fabric for their generosity. Deciding to take advantage of this, De Jesus, using either her real name or that of her clients, would adopt children as often as possible, but would then kill them by either smothering or strangling them. After successfully killing her victims, she would bury them either in shallow graves at the top of Monte Arroio, under her house or would stuff their bodies in clay pots.

Initially, nobody noted anything suspicions about the rate at which she adopted multiple children until April 1, 1772, when a worker at a local charity, Angélica Maria, accidentally stumbled upon a shallow grave in Monte Arroio, containing the corpse of a baby with strangulation marks around its neck. She reported the finding to the authorities, who immediately started investigating, eventually discovering that the child had been adopted by De Jesus under her real name. She was subsequently taken for interrogation, where she immediately confessed that she had killed two newborns on April 6.

Upon hearing her confessions, the authorities searched De Jesus' home, where they unearthed a makeshift graveyard containing the bodies of 18 more infants, with 13 more discovered during excavations on Monte Arroio, for a total of 33 bodies found. Some of the infants' bodies had been dismembered or decapitated, but this was determined to be from decomposition. Upon inspecting adoption records, it was discovered that De Jesus had adopted a total of 34 babies, but she refused to divulge what had happened to the missing 34th baby and its body was never located.

As a result, De Jesus was charged with 33 counts of murder. Two employees at the local charity house were also indicted for criminal negligence in relation to the adoption procedures, but both were released in October of that year. In an attempt to escape prosecution, De Jesus' attorneys claimed as she was under 25 years of age, she was considered a minor under the law and thus ineligible for the death penalty. However, the judges rebuked that claim, exclaiming that if she was old enough to commit such atrocious crimes, then she would judged as an adult. As a result, De Jesus was sentenced to death and ordered to pay approximately 20,000 réis to the state.

On July 1, 1772, De Jesus was paraded around town with a rope around her neck, while a magistrate read her crimes out loud to the onlookers. Her hands were then chopped off and she was burned with a red-hot iron, before she was ultimately garroted. De Jesus' body was summarily burned and her ashes scattered.

In the media and culture 
De Jesus' crimes have been covered in numerous books about serial killers and the death penalty in Portugal. In 2021, a theatric play based on the 2020 book Luiza de Jesus – A Assassina da Roda by Rute de Carvalho Serra premiered in Lisbon, with the eponymous villainess portrayed by actress Maria Henrique.

See also 
 List of serial killers by country

Bibliography

References

1748 births
1772 deaths
18th-century criminals
18th-century executions by Portugal
Executed Portuguese serial killers
Executed Portuguese women
People convicted of murder by Portugal
People executed by ligature strangulation
People executed for murder
People from Penacova
Portuguese female serial killers
Portuguese murderers of children
Portuguese people convicted of murder